Coiled-coil domain containing 137 is a protein that in humans is encoded by the CCDC137 gene.

Model organisms 

Model organisms have been used in the study of CCDC137 function. A conditional knockout mouse line, called Ccdc137tm1a(KOMP)Wtsi was generated as part of the International Knockout Mouse Consortium program — a high-throughput mutagenesis project to generate and distribute animal models of disease to interested scientists — at the Wellcome Trust Sanger Institute.

Male and female animals underwent a standardized phenotypic screen to determine the effects of deletion. Twenty five tests were carried out on mutant mice and two significant abnormalities were observed. No homozygous mutant embryos were recorded during gestation and, in a separate study, no homozygous animals were observed at weaning. The remaining tests were carried out on adult heterozygous mutant animals, but no further abnormalities were seen.

References

External links

Further reading 

Genes mutated in mice